The Duke Road Race Rankings was established in 2002 to analyse and acknowledge the season-long performances of riders involved in a series of motorcycle road racing events held on public roads. It was the idea of Isle of Man-based Peter Duke, son of former World Champion Geoff Duke, who in conjunction with road-racing journalist Leslie Moore, author Mac McDiarmid and archivist Phil Edge, developed a scoring system which would recognise the significance of the individual events. Riders' aggregate performances over a season-long assessment of several road racing events acknowledges the most consistent racer as the ‘championship’ winner. Since Ian Lougher's first-year win in 2002,  all big names of road racing have been considered, such as Adrian Archibald, Richard Britton, Jason Griffiths, Darran Lindsay and, more recently, Manxman Conor Cummins.

Background
The purpose of the Duke Road Race Rankings is to recognise achievements across the year by those riders who enter not just the ‘major’ meetings, but also the smaller road races. To be considered for the Geoff Duke Trophy, star names need to attend lower-profile events to earn points, helping to ensure strong grids for meetings which would otherwise be overshadowed by the main events - the Isle of Man TT, North West 200 and Ulster Grand Prix. The records show a split between Ryan Farquhar and Ian Lougher, apart from 2007 when Manxman Conor Cummins received the award in only his second full-season on the roads.

The Duke Road Race Rankings series features around two dozen meetings every year, including many of the long-established Irish and Isle of Man road races, and has remained largely unaltered since 2002 – apart from cancellations and the addition of extra meetings, such as the Armoy Road Races. The series received coverage in leading publications, such as Motor Cycle News, Road Racing Ireland and Bikesportnews, culminating in an annual presentation gathering.

2022 season
The Duke Road Race Rankings gets fired-up for its 19th Championship season after a 2 year break due to Covid.

2022 Results after the 12th Round

2022 Circuits

1 Cookstown ‘100’ Road Races -  22-23 April
2 Tandragee '100' Road Race -  29-30 April
3 North West ‘200’ Road Races -  12/14 May
4 Pre-TT Classic Road Races - Billown -  28-29 May
5 Isle of Man TT Races -  29 May - 10 June
6 Post TT Races - Billown -  11 June
7 Kells Road Races  -  18-19 June 
8 Munster 100 (Cork) Road Races -  25-26 June 
9 Skerries '100' Road Races -  02-03 July
10 Walderstown Road Races -  09-10 July
11 Southern ‘100’ International Road Races -  11-14 July
12 Faugheen 50 Road Races -  16-17 July 
13 Armoy Road Races -  29-30 July
14 Manx Grand Prix -  21-29 August 
15 Macau Grand Prix -  17-20 November

2019 season
The Duke Road Race Rankings gets fired-up for its 18th Championship season with the opening round of 2019 the KDM Hire Cookstown 100 Road Races on Friday and Saturday 26 & 27 April, which also kick-starts the Irish Road Race season.

Reigning Champion, Mullingar’s Derek McGee will commence the defence of his title at what is the first of a total of 25 rounds, as the Duke Rankings organisers warmly welcome back two rounds at the unique Oliver’s Mount Course in July and September, after a 12-month sabbatical.

2019 Results

2019 Circuits

1 Cookstown ‘100’ Road Races -  26-27 April
2 Tandragee '100' Road Race -  03-04 May
3 North West ‘200’ Road Races -  16/18 May
4 Horice "300 Curves" -  18-19 May
5 Pre-TT Classic Road Races - Billown -  24-27 May
6 Isle of Man TT Races -  25 May - 7 June
7 Post TT Races - Billown -  8 June
8 Imatra Road Races -  14-16 June
9 Kells Road Races  -  15-16 June 
10 Enniskillen Road Races -  28-29 June
11 Skerries '100' Road Races -  06-07 July
12 Southern ‘100’ International Road Races -  08-11 July
13 Walderstown Road Races -  13-14 July
14 Faugheen 50 Road Races -  20-21 July 
15 Armoy Road Races -  26-27 July
16 Barry Sheene Road Race Festival - Oliver's Mount - Scarborough -   27-28 July
17 Munster 100 (Cork) Road Races -  03-04 August 
18 Ulster Grand Prix -  07-10 August
19 Horice "Czech TT Road Races" -  17-18 August
20 Classic TT -  16-26 August
21 Manx Grand Prix -  16-30 August 
22 East Coast Racing Festival (Killalane) -  07-08 September 
23 Frohburg Road Races -  21-22 September
24 Steve Henshaw Gold Cup International - Oliver's Mount - Scarborough -  27-29 September
25 Macau Grand Prix -  14-17 November

2018 season
The 2018 Duke Road Race Rankings Championship gets underway over the weekend of 21 and 22 April, at the Bob Smith Spring Cup Road Races taking place over the popular Oliver's Mount Course - the first of four meetings at the Scarborough, Yorkshire venue this year. The Duke Road Race Rankings now in its 17th year of competition, having first been run in 2002, has a total of 25 rounds this year held in Northern Ireland, Eire, England, the Czech Republic, Finland and Germany. Over the 16 years of the Duke Road Race Rankings, seven overall winners have received the prestigious Geoff Duke Trophy.

Ian Lougher won in the first year and took the title again in consecutive years 2005 & 2006. Ryan Farquhar won his first rankings title in 2003, retaining the number one slot in 2004, then after loaning out the trophy for three years dominated proceedings for the five years 2008 - 2012. Seven championships in total!

Manxman Conor Cummins took the honours in 2007; Michael Dunlop in 2013; Yorkshireman James Cowton 2014; William Dunlop 2015, with the title going to Yorkshire for the second time in 2016 in the hands of Dean Harrison, who retained his title in 2017, taking top spot in the rankings table from the first round, taking seven race wins from seven starts and putting in seven fastest laps and holding that position throughout the 25 rounds.

Deans racing statistics for 2017 Duke Road Race Rankings Championship are, 23 race wins, 2 second places, 5 third places, a further 6 top six placings and seventh places, plus 16 fastest laps, 4 record laps and 1 absolute lap record during the Ulster Grand Prix at Dundrod. All of which earned him a total of 2506 points.

2018 Results

2018 Circuits

1 Spring Cup Road Races Oliver's Mount - Scarborough -   21-22 April  ...CANCELLED !!
2 Cookstown ‘100’ Road Races -  27-28 April
3 Tandragee '100' Road Race -  04-05 May
4 North West ‘200’ Road Races -  17/19 May
5 Horice "300 Curves" -  21/22 May
6 Pre-TT Classic Road Races - Billown -  25-27 May
7 Isle of Man TT Races -  28 May - 8 June
8 Post TT Races - Billown -  9 June
9 Kells Road Races  -  23-24 June  ...CANCELLED !!
10 Cock o'the North Continental Road Races - Oliver's Mount -  23-24 June  ...CANCELLED !!
11 Enniskillen Road Races -  29-30 June
12 Skerries '100' Road Races -  06-07 July
12a Imatra Road Races -  06-08 July
14 Southern ‘100’ International Road Races -  6-12 July
15 Walderstown Road Races -  14-15 July
16 Faugheen 50 Road Races -  21-22 July 
17 Armoy Road Races -  27-28 July
18 Barry Sheene Road Race Festival - Oliver's Mount - Scarborough -   28-29 July  ...CANCELLED !!
19 Ulster Grand Prix -  9/11 August
20 Horice "Czech TT Road Races" -  18-19 August
21 Classic TT -  25/27 August
22 Manx Grand Prix -  27-31 August 
23 Killalane Road Races -  08-09 September 
24 Steve Henshaw Gold Cup International - Oliver's Mount - Scarborough -  22-23 September  ...CANCELLED !!
25 Frohburg Road Races -  22-23 September
26 Macau Grand Prix -  15-18 November

2017 season
The 2017 Duke Road Race Rankings Championship commences on Saturday and Sunday 22 & 23 April at Oliver's Mount, Scarborough with the Bob Smith Spring Cup Road Races.

Imatra has been added to this years Duke Road Race Rankings schedule, as the famous Finnish meeting forms for the first time, part of the prestigious roads series.

2017 Results

2017 Circuits

1 Bob Smith Spring Cup Road Races - Oliver's Mount - Scarborough -   22-23 April 
2 Tandragee '100' Road Race -  21-22 April
3 Cookstown ‘100’ Road Races -  28-29 April
4 North West ‘200’ Road Races -  11/13 May
5 Horice "300 Curves" -  20/21 May
6 Pre-TT Classic Road Races - Billown -  26–29 May
7 Isle of Man TT Races -  27 May - 9 June
8 Post TT Races - Billown -  10 June
9 Cock o'the North Continental Road Race - Oliver's Mount -  24–25 June
10 Skerries '100' Road Races -  30 June-1 July
11 Imatra Road Races -  7-9 June
12 Walderstown Road Races -  8-9 July
12a Southern ‘100’ International Road Races -  10–13 July
14 Barry Sheene Road Race Festival - Oliver's Mount - Scarborough -   22-23 July 
15 Faugheen 50 Road Races -  22–23 July 
16 Armoy Road Races -  28-29 July
17 Dundrod ‘150’ Road Races -  10 August
18 Ulster Grand Prix -  12 August
19 Horice "Czech TT Races" -  26/27 August
20 Classic TT -  25–28 August
21 Manx Grand Prix -  29 Aug – 1 September 
22 East Coast Racing Road Races -  09-10 September 
23 Steve Henshaw Gold Cup International - Oliver's Mount - Scarborough -  23–24 September 
24 Macau Grand Prix -  16-19 November

2016 season

Dean Harrison Wins 'Geoff Duke Trophy'

Dean Harrison has secured the prestigious Duke Road Race Rankings Championship for 2016 becoming only the second Englishman to win the title since the series commenced in 2002.

The twenty-three round series which commenced at the Mid Antrim 150 National Road Races in Northern Ireland in early April and concluded at the recent Macau Motorcycle Grand Prix saw Dean making a cautious start to his 2016 season, his first with the Silkolene Engineering Yamaha Team, before dominating the Duke Road Race Rankings from late June.

The twenty-seven year old Yorkshireman joined the rankings at the second round at the Bob Smith Spring National held at Oliver's Mount slotting into third place slipping to ninth prior to the first International, the North West 200, recovering to eighth, then climbing back to third after the TT, topping the table after the Cock o'the North Road Races at Oliver's Mount, round 10 of this year's series.

From then on Dean headed the Rankings with Lincolnshire rider Ivan Lintin chasing hard to catch his Yorkshire neighbour, which was somewhat thwarted after a racing incident at the Southern 100, which left Ivan missing a number of rounds and him ending up second for the third year running.

2013 Duke Road Race Rankings Champion Michael Dunlop took third place.

Rising star Malachi Mitchel Thomas riding for the John Burrows 'Cookstown' Team headed the 2016 rankings after the opening round at Mid Antrim and remained on the top rung until the TT, despite his untimely passing at the North West 200, such was his early season dominance. 

Malachi finished in 17th place overall in this year's Duke Rankings.

Ian Hutchinson briefly topped the rankings after the TT, prior to Dean's 'throttle hold' on the Championship in the second half of the road racing season and after 23 rounds emerging as a worthy winner, becoming only the seventh rider to see his name engraved on the coveted Geoff Duke Trophy since the Championship Series started in 2002.

2016 Results

2016 Circuits
1 Antrim 150 Road Race -  1-2 April
2 Bob Smith Spring Cup Road Races - Oliver's Mount - Scarborough -   16-17 April 
3 Tandragee '100' Road Race -  22-23 April
4 Cookstown ‘100’ Road Races -  29-30 April
5 North West ‘200’ Road Races -  12/14 May
? Horice Road Races -  13-14 May??
7 Pre-TT Classic Road Races - Billown -  27–28 May
8 Isle of Man TT Races -  29 May - 10 June
9 Post TT Races - Billown -  11 June
10 Cock o'the North Continental Road Race - Oliver's Mount -  18–19 June
11 Kells Road Races -  18-19 June
12 Skerries '100' Road Races -  1-2 July
12a Walderstown Road Races -  9-10 July
14 Southern ‘100’ Road Races -  11–14 July
15 Barry Sheene Road Race Festival - Oliver's Mount - Scarborough -   23-24 July 
16 Armoy Road Races -  29-30 July
17 Aberdare Park -  29-30 July
18 Dundrod ‘150’ Road Races -  11 August
19 Ulster Grand Prix -  13 August
20 Cork Road Races -  20–21 August ....CANCELLED
21 Classic TT -  26–29 August
22 Manx Grand Prix -  30 Aug – 2 September 
23 Killalane Road Races -  10-11 September ....CANCELLED 
24 Steve Henshaw Gold Cup International - Oliver's Mount - Scarborough -  24–25 September 
25 Macau Grand Prix -  17-19 November

2015 season

William Dunlop secured the prestigious Duke Road Race Rankings Championship in 2015, emulating his younger brother Michael who took the title two years ago in 2013.

The twenty-four round series which commenced at the Spring National Road Races at Oliver's Mount in April and concluded at the recent Macau Motorcycle Grand Prix saw William having a season long battle with fellow 'pure roads' rising star Ivan Lintin which was only resolved at the final round in the Southern hemisphere when the chequered flag fell.

Lincolnshire rider Ivan Lintin, riding for the R&C Express Team took an early lead in the 2015 series after the opening round at the North Yorkshire venue remaining in front until the fourth round, the first of the International rounds, the North West 200, where seven-times Duke Rankings winner Ryan Farquhar took over at the top of the table.

Ian Hutchinson took over the helm after the Isle of Man TT Races only for Ivan to regain the leadership after the Barry Sheene Race Festival held at Oliver's Mount, round nine - a lead he was to hold on to until the Ulster Grand Prix where William demoted him to second spot.

The Ballymoney rider continued to head the Duke Rankings as the European rounds were run and concluded once again at Oliver's Mount for the International Steve Henshaw Gold Cup Road Races in September with a mere 24 points separating the pair after 23 rounds with only Macau remaining.

Neither William or Ivan had been invited to race at the tight, twisty closed public roads circuit, the Geoff Duke Trophy looked set to be returning to Ballymoney where it had spent 12 months, two years earlier.

Then Ivan Lintin received an invite to compete and his team R&C Express took up the offer. Ivan making his debut on the 3.8028 mile Circuit da Guia course had to finish in the top six to snatch the championship series from his Ballymoney rival.

In the event Ivan had a steady debut ride finishing in 18th position and finishing second in the Duke Road Race Rankings Championship.

William Dunlop opened his Duke Rankings account at the second round, the Cookstown 100 taking 13th spot in the table, quickly moving into third after a very wet Tandragee 100, the climbing to second after the North West 200.

His incident during the TT saw him drop to seventh before his return to action at the first of the Southern Ireland rounds, Kells, returning to second after the Skerries 100 Road Races. 

Not being 100% fit, William chose to miss the Diamond Jubilee Southern 100, dropping him to fourth in the title chase, although after Walderstown he was up to third.

A double race victory and record lap at the 'Race of Legends' at Armoy William was back in second spot and so to Dundrod and the Ulster Grand Prix in mixed conditions a 2nd; 4th; 5th; 6th & 10th was enough to put the Tyco Team rider at the top of the Duke Rankings becoming only the sixth rider to see his name engraved on the coveted Geoff Duke Trophy since the Championship Series started in 2002.

2015 Results

2015 Circuits
1 Ian Watson Spring Cup Road Races - Oliver's Mount - Scarborough -   11-12 April 
2 Cookstown ‘100’ Road Races -  25 April
3 Tandragee '100' Road Race -  2 May
4 North West ‘200’ Road Races -  14/16 May
5 Horice Road Races -  16/17 May
6 Pre-TT Classic Road Races - Billown -  22–24 May
7 Isle of Man TT Races -  30 May - 5 June
8 Post TT Races - Billown -  6 June
9 Barry Sheene Classic Road Races -  20–21 June
10 Kells Road Races -  28 June
11 Skerries '100' Road Races -  4 July
12 Southern ‘100’ Road Races -  6–9 July
12a Walderstown Road Races -  11 July
14 Cock o'the North Continental Road Race - Oliver's Mount -  18–19 July
15 Armoy Road Races -  25 July
16 Dundrod ‘150’ Road Races -  6 August
17 Ulster Grand Prix -  8 August
18 Faugheen Road Races -  15–16 August 
19 Classic TT -  29–31 August
20 Manx Grand Prix -  2–4 September 
21 Killalane Road Races -  5-6 September 
22 Steve Henshaw Gold Cup International - Oliver's Mount - Scarborough -  12–13 September 
23 Macau Grand Prix -  21 November

2014 season results
The winner of the 2014 Duke Road Race Rankings was honoured at the Auto 66 Dinner & Prize Presentation which took place on Saturday, 17 January at the Holiday Inn, York. Yorkshire's James Cowton becomes the 13th winner of the Duke Road Race Rankings series since its inception in 2002 and the first English rider to collect the prestigious award.

Twenty-two year old James had a stellar season on the roads, his third year racing 'between the hedges' amassing six race victories during the year, at Oliver's Mount, Billown and Dundrod, where he took his first international race win at the Ulster Grand Prix.

James' first victory of the year was at the Blackford's Pre-TT Classic races in the Post Classic race where he also set a new lap record, following that with a double at the Barry Sheene Race Festival at his home circuit, Oliver's Mount before taking another double win at the Dundrod 150 Road Races.

Add in a further nine second and 13 third places out of the 45 races he finished, only three were out of the top six whilst setting seven fastest laps.

James received the coveted Geoff Duke Trophy and replica being only the sixth recipient of the unique award in its 13-year history from Geoff's son Peter Duke, Managing Director of Duke Marketing, who was instrumental in setting up what is now considered to be an accurate 'barometer' of the most successful riders of the season who are dedicated to ‘between the hedges’ road racing, by including the less well-known national events alongside the world-famous international meetings.

The 2014 Duke Road Race Rankings was held over 25 rounds commencing at the Spring National Road Races at the North Yorkshire venue of Oliver's Mount in mid April and concluded mid November at the Macau Motorcycle Grand Prix, James was third in the table after the opening round and throughout the season maintained a position in the top six, slotting into second after the Ulster Grand Prix climbing on to the top rung after the Steve Henshaw International Gold Cup Road Races, the penultimate round, the final round at Macau un-affecting the top three positions.

Peter Duke commented: 'Another thrilling season with 479 point-scoring riders underlines the increasing popularity of real roads racing and I am extremely proud that the Duke Series plays its part in the sport.

'It's often thought Irish riders dominate road racing, but this years results showcase the talent and enthusiasm for 'closed roads' in the rest of the British Isles. Long may it continue!'

2014 Circuits
1 Ian Watson Spring Cup Road Races - Oliver's Mount - Scarborough -   13 April 
2 Cookstown ‘100’ Road Races -  26 April
3 Tandragee '100' Road Race -  3 May
4 North West ‘200’ Road Races -  15/17 May
5 Horice Road Races -  17/18 May
6 Pre-TT Classic Road Races - Billown -  23–26 May
7 Isle of Man TT Races -  31 May - 6 June
8 Post TT Races - Billown -  7 June
9 Barry Sheene Classic Road Races -  21–22 June
10 Kells Road Races -  22 June
11 Bush Road Races -  28 June
12 Skerries '100' Road Races -  5 July
12a Southern ‘100’ Road Races -  7–10 July
14 Walderstown Road Races -  13 July
15 Cork (Glanmire) Road Races -  20 July
16 Cock o'the North Continental Road Race - Oliver's Mount -  19–20 July
17 Armoy Road Races -  26 July
18 Czech TT Road Races -  9–10 August
19 Cahir Road Races -  10 August 
20 Dundrod ‘150’ Road Races -  14 August
21 Ulster Grand Prix -  16 August
22 Classic TT -  23–25 August
23 Manx Grand Prix -  25–29 August 
24 Killalane Road Races -  7 September 
25 Steve Henshaw Gold Cup International - Oliver's Mount - Scarborough -  13–14 September 
26 Macau Grand Prix -  15 November

2013 season
The Duke Road Race Rankings Series commenced for its 12th year of competition at Oliver's Mount, Scarborough, North Yorkshire on 21 April 2013 at the Ian Watson Spring Cup National Road Races, organised by the Auto 66 Club.

The overall winner in this year was Michael Dunlop who won four races in a week at the Isle of Man TT and won at the North West 200, Ulster Grand Prix, Armoy road races, Southern 100 and for the first time won the Steve Henshaw International Gold Cup.

2013 Results

2013 Circuits
1 Ian Watson Spring National Road Races - Oliver's Mount - Scarborough -   21 April  
2 Cookstown ‘100’ Road Races -  27 April 
3 Tandragee '100' Road Race -  4 May  
4 North West ‘200’ Road Races -  16/18 May 
5 Horice Road Races -  19 May
6 Pre-TT Classic Road Races - Billown -  24–27 May  
7 Isle of Man TT Races -  1–7 June  
8 Post TT Races - Billown -  8 June 
9 Barry Sheene Classic Road Races -  15–16 June	
10 Cork (Glanmire) Road Races -  16 June
11 Skerries '100' Road Races -  6 July 
12 Southern ‘100’ Road Races -  8–11 July 
12a Walderstown Road Races -  13–14 July 
14 Cock o'the North - Oliver's Mount -  20–21 July 
15 Armoy Road Races -  27 July 
16 Mid Antrim ‘150’ Road Races -  3 August 
17 Athea Road Races -  11 August  
18 Dundrod ‘150’ Road Races -  15 August 
19 Ulster Grand Prix -  17 August 
20 Classic TT -  24–25 August 
21 Manx Grand Prix -  28–30 August 
22 Terlicko Road Races -  31–1 September
23 Killalane Road Races -  7–8 September 
24 Gold Cup International - Oliver's Mount - Scarborough -  14–15 September 
25 Macau Grand Prix -  14–16 November

2012 season

The Duke Road Race Rankings Series commenced for its 11th year of competition at Oliver's Mount, Scarborough, North Yorkshire on Sunday 15 April 2012 at the Ian Watson Spring Cup National Road Races. Organised by the Auto 66 Club.

2012 Results

2012 Circuits
1 Ian Watson Spring National Road Races - Oliver's Mount - Scarborough -   15 April  
2 Cookstown ‘100’ Road Races -  28 April 
3 Tandragee '100' Road Race -  5 May  
4 North West ‘200’ Road Races -  17th/19 May 
5 Pre-TT Classic Road Races - Billown -  25–28 May  
6 Isle of Man TT Races -  2–8 June  
7 Post TT Races - Billown -  9 June 
8 Mid Antrim ‘150’ Road Races -  16 June 
9 Bush Road Races -  23 June 
10 Barry Sheene Classic Road Races -  24 June	
11 Kells Road Races -  30 June-1 July ....CANCELLED  
12 Skerries '100' Road Races -  7 July 
13 Southern ‘100’ Road Races -  9–12 July 
14 Walderstown Road Races -  14–15 July 
15 Munster '100' Road Races -  21–22 July ....CANCELLED  
16 Cock o'the North - Oliver's Mount -  21–22 July 
17 Armoy Road Races -  28 July 
18 Aderdare Park Road Races -  28–29 July 
19 Athea Road Races -  4–5 August ....CANCELLED 
20 Dundrod ‘150’ Road Races -  9 August 
21 Ulster Grand Prix -  11 August 
22 Manx Grand Prix -  18–31 August 
23 Faugheen '50' Road Races -  25–26 August ....CANCELLED 
24 Killalane Road Races -  8–9 September 
25 Gold Cup International - Oliver's Mount - Scarborough -  15–16 September 
26 Macau Grand Prix -  15–18 November

2011 season
The Duke Road Race Rankings celebrated its 10th year in 2011. Ryan Farquhar retained the Duke Road Rankings title for the fourth successive year, his sixth time in all and received the 'new' Geoff Duke Trophy at the Adelaide Motorcycle Awards Night in Belfast in January 2012. Farquhar has the original trophy in his permanent collection, having won the award outright after completing a hat-trick of title wins in 2008, 2009 and 2010.

2011 Results

Ryan Farquhar said he was 'made up' to win his sixth Duke Road Race Rankings Series after another superb season on his KMR Kawasaki machines. The Dungannon racer claimed 43 victories and 11 podium finishes on his way to a winning points tally of 3,754.

William Dunlop claimed second place ahead of brother Michael, who won a second TT title in 2011. Farquhar set 27 fastest laps during the 23-round series but said he was disappointed at not claiming more wins at the International road races. Farquhar won at both the Manx Grand Prix and Southern 100 meetings on the Isle of Man in this year.

Ian Lougher, who was the inaugural winner in 2002 and took the titles again in 2005 and 2006, finished in fourth place.

2011 Circuits
1 Ian Watson Spring National Road Races - Oliver's Mount - Scarborough - 
2 Cookstown ‘100’ Road Races - 
3 Tandragee '100' Road Race - 
4 North West ‘200’ Road Races - 
5 Pre-TT Classic Road Races - Billown - 
6 Isle of Man TT Races - 
7 Post TT Races - Billown - 
8 Bush Road Races - 
9 Skerries '100' Road Races - 
10 Barry Sheene Classic Road Races - 	
11 Walderstown Road Races - 
12 Aderdare Park Road Races - 
13 Southern ‘100’ Road Races - 
14 Kells Road Races - 
15 Faugheen '50' Road Races - 
16 Cock o'the North - Oliver's Mount - 
17 Armoy Road Races - 
18 Mid Antrim ‘150’ Road Races - 
19 Dundrod ‘150’ Road Races - 
20 Ulster Grand Prix - 
21 Manx Grand Prix - 
22 Munster '100' Road Races - 
23 Athea Road Races - 
24 Killalane Road Races - 
25 Gold Cup International - Oliver's Mount - Scarborough - 
26 Macau Grand Prix -

2010 season

2010 Results

2010 Circuits
1 Spring National - Oliver's Mount - Scarborough - 
2 Cookstown ‘100’ Road Races - 
3 North West ‘200’ Road Races - 
4 Pre-TT Classic Road Races - Billown - 
5 Isle of Man TT Races - 
6 Post TT Races - Billown - 
7 Bush Road Races - 
8 Athea Road Races -   CANCELLED !!
9 Skerries Road Races - 
10 Barry Sheene Classic Road Races - 
11 Cock o'the North - Oliver's Mount - 
12 Walderstown Road Races - 
12a Southern ‘100’ Road Races - 
14 Jurby ‘South’ Road Races - 
15 Kells Road Races -   CANCELLED due to Weather
16 Faugheen Road Races - 
17 Mid Antrim ‘150’ Road Races - 
18 Armoy Road Races - 
19 Dundrod ‘150’ Road Races - 
20 Ulster Grand Prix - 
21 Munster 100 Road Races - 
22 Manx Grand Prix - 
23 Killalane Road Races - 
24 Gold Cup International - Oliver's Mount - Scarborough - 
25 Boyne ‘100’ Road Races - 
26 Macau Grand Prix -

2009 season

2009 Results

2009 Circuits
1 Spring National - Oliver's Mount - Scarborough - 
2 Cookstown ‘100’ Road Races - 
3 Tandragee '100' Road Race - 
4 North West ‘200’ Road Races - 
5 Barry Sheene Classic Road Races - Oliver's Mount - Scarborough - 
6 Pre-TT Classic Road Races - Billown - 
7 Isle of Man TT Races - 
8 Billtown TT Races - 
9 Bush Road Races - 
10 Athea Road Races - 
11 Skerries Road Races - 
12 Cock o'the North - Oliver's Mount - 
12a Walderstown Road Races - 
14 Southern ‘100’ Road Races - 
15 Jurby ‘South’ Road Races - 
16 Kells Road Races - 
17 Faugheen Road Races - 
18 Mid Antrim ‘150’ Road Races - 
19 Armoy Road Races - 
20 Dundrod ‘150’ Road Races - 
21 Ulster Grand Prix - 
22 Manx Grand Prix - 
23 Killalane Road Races - 
24 Gold Cup International - Oliver's Mount - Scarborough - 
25 Boyne ‘100’ Road Races -

2008 season

2008 Results

TT winner Ryan Farquhar clinched the Duke Road Race Rankings for the third time, closing a successful 2008 season by clinching the rankings title at the final meeting of the year, the Gold Cup races at Oliver's Mount, Scarborough. The 2008 Duke Road Race Rankings had been scheduled to be held over 23 rounds, but that number was cut to 19 due to four race meetings being hit by bad weather and other factors.

2008 Circuits

1 Spring National - Oliver's Mount - Scarborough - 
2 Cookstown ‘100’ Road Races - 
3 Tandragee ‘100’ Road Races - 
4 North West ‘200’ Road Races - 
5 Isle of Man TT Races - 
6 Steam Packet Races - Billown - 
7 Bush Road Races - 
8 Athea Road Races(1) - 
9 Skerries Road Races - 
10 Southern ‘100’ Road Races - 
11 Cock o'the North - Oliver's Mount - Scarborough - 
12 Jurby ‘South’ Road Races - 
13 Walderstown Road Races - 
14 Kells Road Races - 
15 Faugheen Road Races - 
16 Dundalk Road Races - 
17 Dundrod ‘150’ Road Races - 
18 Ulster Grand Prix - 
19 Manx Grand Prix - 
20 Killalane Road Races - 
21 Boyne ‘100’ Road Races - 
22 Gold Cup International - Oliver's Mount - Scarborough - 
23 Athea Road Races(2) -

Previous winners

2007

One of the upcoming riders from the Centenary TT races secured the Geoff Duke Trophy. Manxman Conor Cummins, who placed fifth, two sixths and an eighth at TT, secured the top position in the rankings during his first full-year of pure road racing.

Guy Martin, who secured three podium finishes at the Centenary TT, finished in second place, 138 points behind, but 281 points ahead of third placed William Dunlop.

2006

The twenty-five round series were held at all national and international road races in the north and south of Ireland, the Isle of Man and England. At the conclusion 147 points separated the champion and second place man, Martin Finnegan, who in turn was just nine points ahead of the late Darran Lindsay.

2005

2004

2003

2002

Duke Road Racing Rankings
Duke Road Racing Rankings
Motorcycle racing in the United Kingdom